Chrysoritis oreas, the Drakensberg copper or Drakensberg daisy copper, is a species of butterfly in the family Lycaenidae. It is endemic to South Africa, where it is found in montane grassland in the eastern KwaZulu-Natal Drakensberg foothills.

The wingspan is 21–23 mm for males and 22–24 mm for females. Adults are on wing from late September to mid-November. There is one generation per year.

The larvae feed on Thesium species. They are attended to by Myrmicaria nigra ants.

References

Chrysoritis
Butterflies described in 1891
Endemic butterflies of South Africa
Taxonomy articles created by Polbot